Ecocide is destruction of the natural environment that is widespread, long-term and severe. The concept of ecocide originated in the 1970s after the United States devastated the environment in Vietnam through use of Agent Orange during the Vietnam War.  

Ecocide may describe a wide range of acts and may occur with or without intent. There is no international law against ecocide that applies in peacetime, but the Rome Statute outlaws ecocide during wartime if it is "clearly excessive" in relation to expected military advantage. There has been debate about including ecocide as fifth crime against peace under the Rome Statute, and a proposal to do so failed in 2010. Ten nations have criminalised ecocide under domestic law. 

Ecocide can threaten human populations, especially Indigenous people, and may result in cultural genocide. Ecocide may also be an effect of climate change.

Aspects of ecocide 
The roots of the word are the Greek oikos (home) and the Latin cadere (to kill).

Genocide 
Ecocide can threaten a people's cultural and physical existence, and several studies have shown that ecocide has genocidal dimensions. Destruction of the natural environment can result in cultural genocide by preventing people from following their traditional way of life. This is especially true for Indigenous people. Ecocide resulting from climate change and resource extraction may become a primary driver of genocide worldwide. Some Indigenous scholars have argued that ecocide and genocide are inextricable.

Mainstream understanding of genocide (as defined by the United Nations) restricts genocide to acts committed against the bodies of individual people. Some genocide researchers have found that this human rights framework does a disservice to colonised Indigenous people who experienced social death with the loss of relationship to their land but who were not always killed in the process of colonisation.

Climate change and mass extinction 
The ongoing mass extinction of species has been called ecocide. US environmental theorist Patrick Hossay argues that modern industrial civilization is ecocidal.

Climate change may result in ecocide. For example, ocean acidification and warming causes damage to coral reefs, although ecocide of coral reefs has also been attributed to causes not related to climate change.

Criminalization of ecocide under the Rome Statute has been proposed as a deterrent to corporations responsible for climate change, although others argue that criminalizing ecocide will not address the root causes of the climate crisis.

Intent 
Ecocide may occur with or without intent. Environmental lawyer Polly Higgins distinguishes between ascertainable and non-ascertainable ecocide, with the former having a clear human cause while the latter does not. An example of non-ascertainable ecocide is destruction due to extreme weather events related to climate change.

Arthur H. Westing discussed the element of intent in relation to ecocide, stating that "Intent may not only be impossible to establish without admission but, I believe, it is essentially irrelevant."

International law 
There is no international law against ecocide that applies in peacetime, but the Rome Statute makes it a crime to

In 1977 the United Nations adopted the Convention on the Prohibition of Military or any other Hostile use of Environmental Modification Technique. Article I of this Convention says, "Each State Party to this Convention undertakes not to engage in military or any other hostile use of environmental modification techniques having widespread, long-lasting or severe effects as the means of destruction, damage or injury to any other State Party." There is no definition of the terms 'widespread, long-lasting or severe'.

Efforts to expand international ecocide law 

Efforts to criminalise ecocide have sought to include the crime among those prosecuted by the International Criminal Court established by the Rome Statute. These crimes include genocide, crimes against humanity, war crimes, and the crime of aggression.

In 2010, environmental lawyer Polly Higgins submitted a proposal to the United Nations International Law Commission that defined ecocide as:The extensive damage to, destruction of or loss of ecosystems of a given territory, whether by human agency or by any other causes, to such an extent that peaceful enjoyment by the inhabitants of that territory has been severely diminished.The full proposal, which was submitted to the International Law Commission, is set out in chapters 5 and 6 of her book Eradicating Ecocide: Laws and Governance to Prevent the Destruction of our Planet, Polly Higgins, Published by Shepheard Walwyn: 2010. This definition includes damage caused by individuals, corporations and/or the state. It also includes environmental destruction from 'other causes' (i.e. harm that is not necessarily caused by human activity). The purpose was to create a duty of care to mitigate or prevent naturally occurring disasters as well as creating criminal responsibility for human-caused ecocide.

In December 2019 at the 18th session of the Assembly of States Parties to the Rome Statute of the International Criminal Court, Vanuatu and the Maldives called for ecocide to be added to the Statute.

In June 2021, an international panel of lawyers submitted a definition of ecocide and proposed a draft amendment to the Rome Statute that would include ecocide among the international crimes prosecuted under the Statute. The panel included members from the UK, Senegal, the US, France, Ecuador, Bangladesh, Sierra Leone, Samoa, and Norway, and their proposed definition is:unlawful or wanton acts committed with knowledge that there is a substantial likelihood of severe and widespread or long-term damage to the environment being caused by those acts.

European Citizens' Initiative 
On January 22, 2013, a committee of eleven citizens from nine EU countries launched the "European Citizens Initiative (ECI) to End Ecocide in Europe". The initiative aimed at criminalizing ecocide and investments in activities causing ecocide, as well as denying market access to the EU for products derived from ecocidal activities. Three MEPs, Keith Taylor, Eva Joly, and Jo Leinen, publicly gave the first signatures. The initiative did not collect the 1 million signatures needed, but was discussed in the European Parliament. The proposal has yet to be accepted by the United Nations.

History

1970s 

The concept of ecocide originated in the 1970s after the United States devastated the environment in Vietnam through use of Agent Orange during the Vietnam War. The word was first recorded at the Conference on War and National Responsibility in Washington DC, where American plant biologist and bioethicist Arthur Galston proposed a new international agreement to ban ecocide.

In 1972 at the United Nations Stockholm Conference on the Human Environment, Prime Minister of Sweden Olof Palme called the Vietnam War an ecocide. Others, including Indira Gandhi from India and Tang Ke, the leader of the Chinese delegation, also denounced the war in human and environmental terms, calling for ecocide to be an international crime. A Working Group on Crimes Against the Environment was formed at the conference, and a draft Ecocide Convention was submitted into the United Nations in 1973. This convention called for a treaty that would define and condemn ecocide as an international war crime, recognising that "man has consciously and unconsciously inflicted irreparable damage to the environment in times of war and peace."

The ILC 1978 Yearbook's Draft articles on State Responsibility and International Crime included: "an international crime (which) may result, inter alia, from: (d) a serious breach of an international obligation of essential importance for the safeguarding and preservation of the human environment, such as those prohibiting massive pollution of the atmosphere or of the seas." Supporters who spoke out in favor of a crime of ecocide included Romania, the Holy See, Austria, Poland, Rwanda, Congo and Oman.

1980s 

The Whitaker Report, commissioned by the Sub-Commission on the Promotion and Protection of Human Rights on the prevention and punishment of genocide was prepared by then Special Rapporteur, Benjamin Whitaker. The report contained a passage that Some members of the Sub-Commission have, however, proposed that the definition of genocide should be broadened to include cultural genocide or "ethnocide", and also "ecocide": adverse alterations, often irreparable, to the environment – for example through nuclear explosions, chemical weapons, serious pollution and acid rain, or destruction of the rain forest – which threaten the existence of entire populations, whether deliberately or with criminal negligence.Discussion of international crimes continued in the International Law Commission in 1987, where it was proposed that "the list of international crimes include "ecocide", as a reflection of the need to safeguard and preserve the environment, as well as the first use of nuclear weapons, colonialism, apartheid, economic aggression and mercenarism".

1990s 

In 1996, Canadian/Australian lawyer Mark Gray published his proposal for an international crime of ecocide, based on established international environmental and human rights law. He demonstrated that states, and arguably individuals and organizations, causing or permitting harm to the natural environment on a massive scale breach a duty of care owed to humanity in general. He proposed that such breaches, where deliberate, reckless or negligent, be identified as ecocide where they entail serious, and extensive or lasting, ecological damage; international consequences; and waste.

2010s 

In 2011, the Hamilton Group drafted a mock Ecocide Act and then tested it via a mock trial in the UK Supreme Court.

In 2012, a concept paper on the Law of Ecocide was sent out to governments. In June 2012 the idea of making ecocide a crime was presented to legislators and judges from around the world at the World Congress on Justice Governance and Law for Environmental Sustainability, held in Mangaratiba before the Rio +20 Earth Summit. Making ecocide an international crime was voted as one of the top twenty solutions to achieving sustainable development at the World Youth Congress in Rio de Janeiro in June 2012.

In October 2012 the international conference Environmental Crime: Current and Emerging Threats was held in Rome and hosted by the United Nations Interregional Crime and Justice Research Institute (UNICRI) in cooperation with United Nations Environmental Programme (UNEP) and the Ministry of the Environment (Italy). The conference recognized that environmental crime is an important new form of transnational organized crime in need a greater response. One of the outcomes was that UNEP and UNICRI head up a study into the definition of environmental crime and give due consideration to making ecocide an international crime.

In May 2017 the grassroots citizen's movement End Ecocide on Earth published a proposal covering jurisdiction, substantive criminal law, procedural due process, declaratory judgements, reparations, and individual or corporate penalty provisions within the existing Rome Statute framework.

In November 2019 Pope Francis, addressing the International Association of Penal Law (AIDP), called on the international community to recognize ecocide as a “fifth category of crime against peace.”

In July 2019, a group of 24 scientists called for ecocide committed in conflict areas be punished as a war crime.

2020s
In late November 2020, a panel of international lawyers chaired by British law professor Philippe Sands and Zambian judge Florence Mumba started drafting a proposed law criminalizing ecocide.

In May 2021, the European parliament adopted 2 reports advancing the recognition of Ecocide as a crime.

In order to enforce implementation and increase citizens’ trust in EU rules, and to prevent and remedy environmental damage more effectively, Parliament demands that the Environmental Liability Directive (ELD) and the Environmental Crime Directive (ECD) be improved.

Also in May 2021 the 179 members of the Inter-Parliamentary Union (IPU) passed an almost-unanimous resolution inviting member parliaments recognise the crime of ecocide.

Domestic law 
Ten countries have codified ecocide as a crime within their borders during peacetime. Those countries followed the wording of Article 26 of the International law Commission (ILC) Draft which referred to intentionally causing "widespread, long-term and severe damage to the natural environment" within the context of war - bearing in mind that Article 26 was removed from the final draft submitted to the Rome Statute of the International Criminal Court in 1996. None of the countries established procedures to measure 'intention'.

The countries with domestic ecocide laws are France (2021), Georgia (1999), Armenia (2003), Ukraine (2001), Belarus (1999), Ecuador (2008; 2014), Khazakhstan (1997), Kyrgyzstan (1997), Moldova (2002), Russia (1996), Tajikistan (1998), Uzbekistan (1994), Vietnam (1990).

France 
In 2021, The French National Assembly approved the creation of an "ecocide" offence as part of a battery of measures aimed at protecting the environment and tackling climate change. Offenders will be liable to up to 10 years in prison and a fine of 4.5 million euros ($5.4 million)

See also
 Ecophagy
 Ecotage
 Environmental crime
 Environmental disaster
 Environmental justice
 Holocene extinction
 Involuntary manslaughter
 List of environmental issues
 Operation Ranch Hand
 Rights of nature
 Scorched earth
 War on drugs#Aerial herbicide application
 Water scarcity
 Toxic colonialism

References

Further reading 
 
 
  
 
 Wijdekop, Femke. (2016). "Against Ecocide: Legal Protection for Earth." Great Transition Initiative.

External links 

 Official website of Stop ECOCIDE
 Coverage of Stop ECOCIDE in NY Times
 Official website of the European citizens' initiative
 The story of stuff
 To stop climate disaster, make ecocide an international crime. It's the only way. The Guardian. 24 February 2021.

Ecocide
Environmental justice
Environmental law
Theories of law
Global environmental issues
Proposed laws
International criminal law